The state funeral of Muhammad Zia-ul-Haq was held on 19 August 1988 in the Shah Faisal Mosque in Islamabad, Pakistan. General Zia-ul-Haq, Chief of Army Staff (COAS) who was also serving as the President of Pakistan, was killed when a C-130 Hercules plane (Registration:	23494, call sign: Pak-1) crashed near the Sutlej river on 17 August 1988. Several conspiracy theories exist regarding this incident, as other high-profile civilian and military personnel also died in the crash including the Chairman Joint chiefs General Akhtar Abdur Rehman and the United States Ambassador to Pakistan, Arnold Lewis Raphel, and the military attaché, Brigadier General Herbert M. Wassom.

The official announcement of Zia's death was announced by Ghulam Ishaq Khan, then-Senate Chairman and Acting President, simultaneously via radio and television transmission on 17 August 1988. The Government of Pakistan announced to hold the state funeral given the Zia-ul-Haq who was buried with military honors in a specially crafted white marble tomb, adjacent to Shah Faisal Mosque in Islamabad.

The funeral was attended by 30 heads of state, including the presidents of Bangladesh, China, Egypt, Iran, India, Turkey, and the United Arab Emirates as well as the Aga Khan IV and representatives of the crowned heads of Saudi Arabia and Jordan. Key American politicians, U.S. Embassy staff in Islamabad, key personnel of the Pakistan Armed Forces, and chiefs of staff of the Army, Navy, Air Force also attended the funeral.

Events and crash

On 17 August 1988, President Zia ul-Haq, with his senior delegation, arrived in Bahawalpur where he was joined by the two American Christian missionaries to visit the local convent to condole the death of an American nun murdered in Bahawalpur a few days before making a brief stop at the Tamewali Test Range.

After witnessing and viewing the live fire demonstration of the U.S. Army's M1 Abrams at the Thamewali Test Range, President Zia and his delegation left by army helicopter. The demonstration was organized by Major-General Mahmud Ali Durrani, then-GOC of the 1st Armoured Division of the Armoured Corps as the M1 Abrams, the standard U.S. Army's weapon system was expected to join service with the Pakistan Army.

At 3:40 p.m. (Pakistan Standard Time) on 17 August 1988 the VIP flight took off from Bahawalpur Airport. On board the C-130 plane were a total of 30 people (17 passengers and 13 crew members); with Zia-ul-Haq were the United States Ambassador to Pakistan, Arnold Raphel, Brigadier General Herbert M. Wassom, the chief of the U.S. military mission in Pakistan, and a group of senior officers from Pakistan army. The plane had been fitted with an air-conditioned VIP capsule where Zia and his American guests were seated. It was walled off from the flight crew and a passenger and baggage section in the rear.

The aircraft departed Bahawalpur early, ahead of a storm. For 2 minutes and 30 seconds, it rose into a clear sky. Takeoff was smooth and without problems. At 3:51pm (PST) Bahawalpur control tower lost contact, and the plane plunged from the sky and hit the ground with such force that it was blown to pieces and wreckage scattered over a wide area. Witnesses cited in Pakistan's official investigation said that the C-130 began to pitch "in an up-and-down motion" while flying low shortly after takeoff before going into a "near-vertical dive", exploding on impact, killing all on board. There were many investigations into this crash but no satisfactory cause was ever found.

Funeral
His funeral was held on 19 August 1988 in the capital of Islamabad, just 70 hours after the crash. It was held with full military honors that included a sounding by light artillery of a 21-gun salute. During the ceremony, nearly 1 million mourners chanted "Zia ul-Haq, you will live as long as the sun and moon remain above." He was buried in a 4-by-10-foot grave in front of the Faisal Mosque that Zia ordered the construction built of in honour of King Faisal of Saudi Arabia and the friendship between Pakistan and Saudi Arabia. In attendance was his successor President Ghulam Ishaq Khan, members of the Joint Chiefs of Staff Committee, high-ranking military and civilian officials, as well as foreign dignitaries such as President Yang Shangkun of China, President Hussain Muhammad Ershad of Bangladesh and US Secretary of State George P. Shultz. Shultz called Zia "a great fighter for freedom," while Vice President George H. W. Bush called him a "great friend."<ref>Ghattas, Kim (2020). Black wave : Saudi Arabia, Iran, and the forty-year rivalry that unraveled culture, religion, and collective memory in the Middle East (1 ed.). New York: Henry Holt and Company. ISBN 978-1-250-13120-1</bdi>. OCLC 1110155277.</ref>

Investigation
Washington sent a team of United States Air Force officers to assist the Pakistanis in the investigation, but the two sides reached sharply different conclusions, leading to distrust as well as many arguments and fights.

U.S. conclusions
Mrs Ely-Raphel and Brigadier-General Wassom's widow were both told by U.S. investigators that the crash had been caused by a mechanical problem common with the C-130, and that a similar incident had occurred to a C-130 in Colorado which had narrowly avoided crashing. Mahmud Ali Durrani also blamed the C-130 which he said historically had issues.

Robert Oakley, who replaced Arnold Raphel as U.S. ambassador following the crash and helped to handle the investigation, has also expressed this view. He has pointed out that 20 or 30 C-130s have suffered similar incidents. He has identified the mechanical fault as a problem with the hydraulics in the tail assembly. Although USAF pilots had handled similar emergencies, the Pakistani pilots were less well equipped to do so, lacking C-130 experience and also flying low.

Ronan Farrow indicates that the FBI had a statutory authority to investigate the event but was ordered by Shultz "to stay away". Also, the CIA did not investigate. Air Force investigators who had been at the crash site ruled out mechanical failure but their report was not made public.

Pakistani conclusions
Some weeks after the crash, a 27-page summary of a secret 365-page report was released by Pakistani investigators in which they said that they had found evidence of possible problems with the aircraft's elevator booster package, as well as frayed or snapped control cables. Analysis by a U.S. lab found "extensive contamination" by brass and aluminium particles in the elevator booster package, but the report said "failure of the elevator control system due to a mechanical failure...is ruled out". It cited the aircraft-maker Lockheed as saying that "even with the level of contamination found in the system, they have not normally experienced any problems other than wear".

The report concluded that the contamination of the elevator booster package might at worst have caused sluggish controls leading to overcontrol but not to an accident. In the absence of a mechanical cause, the Pakistani inquiry concluded that the crash was due to an act of sabotage. They found no conclusive evidence of an explosion on the aircraft but said that chemicals that could be used in small explosives were detected in mango seeds and a piece of rope found on the aircraft. They also added that "the use of a chemical agent to incapacitate the pilots and thus perpetuate the accident therefore remains a distinct possibility".

Journalistic investigation
Journalist and author Mohammed Hanif, who became head of Urdu-language service at BBC, told American journalist Dexter Finkins that, while working in London after 1996, he "became consumed" with determining how Zia was killed. Hanif "made phone calls and researched the lives of those around Zia", attempting to assess possible perpetrators—"the C.I.A., the Israelis, the Indians, the Soviets, rivals inside the Army". He stated he was "met with silence". "No one would talk—not Zia's wife, not the Ambassador's wife, no one in the Army.... I realized, there's no way in hell I'll ever find out." Hanif later wrote the novel A Case of Exploding Mangoes which humorously describes four assassinations all occurring simultaneously. The possible assassins are a senior Pakistani Army officer, a Trade Union on behalf of a murder official, a crow on behalf of a blind woman imprisoned for fornication after a rape and the son of an army officer killed by Zia.

Theories
According to Barbara Crossette, The New York Times  South Asia bureau chief from 1988 to 1991: 

No evidence has come to light to prove a conspiracy, but there have been several theories variously implicating the United States and India as well as Afghanistan and the Soviet Union. Zia also had high-level enemies within the Pakistani government.

Soviet or US assassination
General Hameed Gul, the head of Pakistan's Inter Services Intelligence agency at the time, told The Times that the Pakistani President was killed in a conspiracy involving a "foreign power".
Early reports suggested that Raphel had only been summoned to join the flight at the last minute, which fueled conspiracy theories blaming the United States. However, Raphel's widow has stated that her husband always planned to join Zia on the aircraft, and that it was General Wassom who was added at the last minute.

Stoking the suspicion that the Soviets were involved in the plane crash, one of the fatalities was General Akhtar Abdur Rehman, the Chairman Joint Chiefs of Staff Sommittee and former head of the nation's spy agency, Inter Service Intelligence (ISI); Abdur Rehman was a leader of the Afghan mujahedin's war against the Soviets.

Pakistan government-supported assassination
Some have suspected the anti-Zia group al-Zulfiqar, led by Murtaza Bhutto, brother of Benazir Bhutto, the Pakistani politician who would ultimately gain most from Zia's departure. Zia's son Ijaz-ul-Haq told Barbara Crossette a year after the crash that he was "101 percent sure" that Murtaza was involved. Benazir Bhutto suggested that the fatal crash might well have been an "act of God".

Mossad assassination
Writing in the Fall 2005 issue of World Policy Journal, former U.S. ambassador to India John Gunther Dean, blamed Mossad, the Israeli intelligence agency, for orchestrating Zia's assassination in retaliation for Pakistan developing a nuclear weapon to counteract India, and to prevent Zia, an effective Muslim leader, from continuing to influence U.S. foreign policy. However, Dean said he had no proof for his assertion.

Pakistan Army-supported assassination
People have also pointed to some senior dissatisfied generals of the Pakistan Army itself. General Mirza Aslam Beg, who became Chief of Army Staff following Zia's death, witnessed the crash from his aircraft, which had just taken off. Instead of returning to Bahawalpur, he headed for Islamabad, an action which later caused controversy and led some to allege that he was involved in the incident since he had reportedly been scheduled to fly with Zia in the flight, but had changed his plans at the last minute. He was later accused of being behind the attack by Zia's son Ijaz-ul-Haq.

Zia's death "entails the mist of conspiracy theory".

See also

List of unsolved deaths
Władysław Sikorski's death controversy, about World War II death of Polish prime minister in exile in plane crash that was similarly investigated by two different countries that came to different conclusions, for which conspiracy theories blaming different actors continue to be offered.

References

Muhammad Zia-ul-Haq
1988 in Pakistan
Accidents and incidents involving military aircraft
Accidents and incidents involving the Lockheed C-130 Hercules
Aviation accidents and incidents in 1988
Aviation accidents and incidents in Pakistan
Aviation accidents and incidents involving state leaders
August 1988 events in Asia
Conspiracy theories in Pakistan
Zia-ul-Haq, Muhammad
Zia-ul-Haq, Muhammad
Zia-ul-Haq, Muhammad
Zia-ul-Haq, Muhammad
Pakistan–Soviet Union relations
Pakistan–United States relations
Political history of Pakistan
Zia-ul-Haq, Muhammad
Zia-ul-Haq, Muhammad
Zia-ul-Haq
Pakistan military scandals